Alitretinoin, or 9-cis-retinoic acid, is a form of vitamin A. It is also used in medicine as an antineoplastic (anti-cancer) agent developed by Ligand Pharmaceuticals. It is a first generation retinoid. Ligand gained Food and Drug Administration (FDA) approval for alitretinoin in February 1999.

Medical uses

Kaposi’s sarcoma
In the United States, topical alitretinoin is indicated for the treatment of skin lesions in AIDS-related Kaposi's sarcoma. Alitretinoin is not indicated when systemic therapy against Kaposi's sarcoma is required. It has received EMA (11 October 2000) and FDA (2 March 1999) approval for this indication.

Chronic hand eczema
Alitretinoin has been granted prescription rights in the UK (08/09/2008) for in chronic hand eczema as used by mouth.
In May 2009 the National Institute for Health and Clinical Excellence (NICE) issued preliminary guidance on the use of alitretinoin for the treatment of severe chronic hand eczema in adults. The recommendation stated that only patients with severe chronic hand eczema who are unresponsive to potent topical corticosteroids, oral immunosuppressants or phototherapy should receive the drug. Final NICE guidance is expected in August 2009.

Adverse effects

Systemic use

Very common (>10% frequency):
 Headache
 Hypertriglyceridemia
 High density lipoprotein decreased
 Hypercholesterolemia

Common (1-10% frequency):

 Anaemia
 Increased iron binding capacity
 Monocytes decreased
 Thrombocytes increased
 TSH decreased
 Free T4 decreased
 Flushing
 Conjunctivitis
 Dry eye
 Eye irritation
 Transaminase increased
 Dry skin
 Dry lips
 Cheilitis
 Eczema
 Dermatitis
 Erythema
 Hair loss
 Joint pain
 Muscle pains
 Blood creatine phosphokinase increased

Uncommon (0.1-1% frequency):

 Blurred vision
 Cataracts
 Nose bleeds
 Itchiness
 Rash
 Skin exfoliation
 Asteatotic eczema
 Exostosis
 Ankylosing spondylitis

Rare (<0.1% frequency):
 Benign intracranial hypertension
 Vasculitis

Unknown frequency:

 Anaphylactic reactions
 Hypersensitivity
 Depression
 Mood changes
 Suicidal ideation
 Decreased night vision

Topical use

Very common (>10% frequency):
 Rash (77%)
 Pain (34%)
 Itchiness (11%)

Common (1-10% frequency):
 Exfoliative dermatitis
 Oedema
 Skin changes
 Paraesthesia

Contraindications
Pregnancy is an absolute contraindication as with most other vitamin A products, it should also be avoided when it comes to systemic use in any women that is of childbearing potential and not taking precautions to prevent pregnancy. Toctino (the oral capsule formulation of alitretinoin) contains soya oil and sorbitol. Patients who are allergic to peanut, soya or with rare hereditary fructose intolerance should not take this medicine. It is also contraindicated in nursing mothers. The oral formulation of alitretinoin is contraindicated in patients with: 

 Hepatic insufficiency
 Severe chronic kidney disease
 Uncontrolled hypercholesterolemia
 Uncontrolled hypertriglyceridemia
 Uncontrolled hypothyroidism
 Hypervitaminosis A
 Hypersensitivity to any excipients in alitretinoin

Interactions 
It is a CYP3A4 substrate and hence any inhibitor or inducer of this enzyme may alter plasma levels of alitretinoin. It should not be given to patients with excess vitamin A in their system as there is a potential for its actions on the retinoid X receptor to be exacerbated. It may also interact with tetracyclines to cause benign intracranial hypertension.

Overdose
Alitretinoin is a form of vitamin A. Alitretinoin has been administered in oncological clinical studies at dosages of more than 10-times of the therapeutic dosage given for chronic hand eczema. The adverse effects observed were consistent with retinoid toxicity, and included severe headache, diarrhoea, facial flushing and hypertriglyceridemia. These effects were reversible.

Mechanism of action
Alitretinoin is believed to be the endogenous ligand (a substance that naturally occurs in the body that activates this receptor) for retinoid X receptor, but it also activates the retinoic acid receptor.

References

External links 
 

Retinoids
Antineoplastic drugs
Cyclohexenes